Babatunde Hunpe is a Nigerian politician at the Federal House of Representatives level. He currently serves as the Federal Representative representing Badagry constituency in the 9th National Assembly. He was appointed Special Adviser to the Governor on rural development during the Babatunde Fashola administration in 2011. Also in 2015, he was appointed Special Adviser to the Governor on the Environment during the Akinwunmi Ambode administration.

References

Politicians from Lagos
Living people
Year of birth missing (living people)
Members of the House of Representatives (Nigeria)